Setaria cernua is a species of grass in the family Poaceae. It is endemic to Ecuador, where it occurs in Imbabura, Carchi and Chimborazo Provinces. Some populations are protected in the Parque Nacional Llanganates, the Parque Nacional Sangay, and the Reserva Ecológica Cayambe-Coca. While its range is limited, it is common there.

References

cernua
Endemic flora of Ecuador
Least concern plants
Taxonomy articles created by Polbot